Thanks Badge may refer to:

 Thanks Badge (GSUSA) and Thanks Badge II used by the GSUSA
 Thanks Badge (Scouting) used by the Scouting Association prior to World War II